Prays sparsipunctella is a moth in the family Plutellidae.

External links
 Prays sparsipunctella at www.catalogueoflife.org.

Plutellidae
Moths described in 1924